Crambus sibirica is a moth in the family Crambidae. It was described by Sergei Alphéraky in 1897. It is found in the Russian Far East and Japan.

References

Crambini
Moths described in 1897
Moths of Asia
Moths of Japan